Brek, also known as Brek Karen, Bwe, and Kayaw, is a Karen language of Burma.

Distribution
eastern Kayah State (30 villages)
northeastern Kayin State: Yado area
southern Shan State: Pekon township

Dialects
Bwe-Kayaw
Upper Kayaw (standardized variety used for literature)
Lower Kayaw

Writing system

References

Karenic languages